Jean-François Leleu (1729 - 1807) was a leading French furniture-maker (ébéniste) of the eighteenth century who was trained alongside his rival Jean-Henri Riesener, in the workshop of Jean-François Oeben (1721-1763). After his master's death, he became the workshop's lead and became a master ébéniste in 1764.  Leleu had the patronage of wealthy aristocrats, including the Prince de Condé, Louis-Joseph de Bourbon. His furniture was known for its high quality, elegance, and restraint, with inlays of diamonds, roses, or floral bouquets. When working for marchands-merciers, he also used inlays of Sèvres porcelain and lacquer. Leleu's clients included the Prince de Condé and Madame du Barry.

References

External links 

 Insecula.com photographs
 Universalis encyclopedia entry (French)

French furniture makers
French furniture designers